Hick is a surname or a nickname. Notable people with the name include:

Surname
Andrew Hick (born 1971), Australian rugby league footballer
Benjamin Hick (1790–1842), English civil and mechanical engineer
Bruce Hick (born 1963), Australian rower
Graeme Hick (born 1966), English cricketer
Jacqueline Hick (1919–2004), Australian painter
Jochen Hick (born 1960), German film director
John Hick (MP) (1815–1894), English MP, civil and mechanical engineer
John Hick (1922–2012), philosopher of religion and theologian
Les Hick (born 1927), English footballer
Pentland Hick (1919–2016), British entrepreneur, author, and publisher
Rarriwuy Hick (born 1990/1991), Australian actress
W. E. Hick (1912–1974), British psychologist

Nickname
Hick Cady (1886–1946), baseball player
Hick Carpenter (1855–1937), baseball player
The Hick from French Lick (born 1956), Larry Bird, basketball player

Other uses
 Hick, another term for the derogatory term redneck

See also
Hicks (surname)
Hicks (disambiguation)

Nicknames
Surnames from given names